James O’Donnell (March 25, 1840 – March 17, 1915) was a politician from the U.S. State of Michigan.

Biography
O’Donnell was born in Norwalk, Connecticut, and moved to Jackson, Michigan, with his parents in 1848.  He pursued preparatory studies and learned the printing trade.  During the Civil War, he enlisted as a private in the First Regiment, Michigan Volunteer Infantry, and served two years.  He served as recorder of the city of Jackson from 1863 to 1866 and established the Jackson Daily Citizen in 1865.  He was a Presidential elector in 1872 and served as mayor of Jackson in 1876 and 1877.  He was appointed in 1878 aide-de-camp on the staff of Governor Charles Croswell, with the rank of colonel.

O’Donnell was elected as a Republican from Michigan's 3rd congressional district to the 49th United States Congress and to the three succeeding Congresses, serving from March 4, 1885, to March 3, 1893.   He served as chairman of the Committee on Education during the 51st Congress.  In 1892, he ran in Michigan's 2nd congressional district, losing to Democrat James S. Gorman.

James O’Donnell returned to Jackson and devoted his time to the publication of the Jackson Daily Citizen, and retired in 1910.  He was considered the father of the beet-sugar industry of Michigan.  He died in Jackson just eight days before his 75th birthday and was interred there in Mount Evergreen Cemetery.

References
 Retrieved on 2008-02-14
James O'Donnell at The Political Graveyard

1840 births
1915 deaths
Union Army soldiers
Republican Party members of the United States House of Representatives from Michigan
Politicians from Norwalk, Connecticut
Politicians from Jackson, Michigan
19th-century American politicians